XXP was a German documentary TV station headquartered in Berlin.

It was started in 2001 by Spiegel TV and dctp.  It broadcast documentaries, magazine shows and reports, discussions and interviews. There was also a daily news program. The programs mainly came from Spiegel TV, dctp, BBC, Süddeutsche Zeitung.

In January 2006 Discovery Communications bought the TV station. It was replaced in September 2006 by DMAX.

The station was available on satellite (Astra 19.2°E) and certain cable TV networks.

Audience share

References

External links

German-language television stations
Television channels and stations established in 2001
Television channels and stations disestablished in 2006
2001 establishments in Germany
2006 disestablishments in Germany
Defunct television channels in Germany
Television stations in Berlin